Synaphe rungsi is a species of moth of the family Pyralidae. It was described by Daniel Lucas in 1937. It is found in Morocco.

References

Moths described in 1937
Pyralini
Endemic fauna of Morocco
Moths of Africa